Dewan Singh Bhakuni (born 1930) is an Indian natural product chemist, stereochemist and a former director general-grade scientist of the Central Drug Research Institute. He is known for his researches on the biogenesis of alkaloids and is an elected fellow of the Indian Academy of Sciences, the National Academy of Sciences, India and the Indian National Science Academy. The Council of Scientific and Industrial Research, the apex agency of the Government of India for scientific research, awarded him the Shanti Swarup Bhatnagar Prize for Science and Technology, one of the highest Indian science awards, in 1975, for his contributions to chemical sciences.

Biography 

D. S. Bhakuni, born on 30 December 1930 in the Indian state of Uttar Pradesh, graduated in chemistry from Allahabad University and completed his master's degree at the same institution. He started his career in 1958 as a teaching faculty but a year later, joined Central Drug Research Institute (CDRI), Lucknow and worked there for three years. His next move was to National Botanical Research Institute in 1962 but later went to the UK to pursue his doctoral studies. He secured a Phd in 1965 from the University of London under the guidance of Sir Derek Barton of Imperial College London, a renowned organic chemist and 1969 Nobel laureate; his thesis being Studies in alkaloid biosynthesis. He would also receive the degree of Doctor of Science from London University in 1978. Returning to India, he joined CDRI in 1965 where he spent the rest of his official career till his superannuation in 1990 as a director general-grade scientist. In between, he had a stint at University of Concepción, Chile as a visiting professor. Post-retirement, he was selected as an emeritus scientist by the Council of Scientific and Industrial Research.

Legacy 
Bhakuni, during the course of his active researches, studied the structure and stereochemistry of several indigenous plants and synthesized them for finding out the biologically active compounds; his work on the biogenesis of alkaloids was based on these examinations. These studies are known to be pioneering studies on alkaloid biosynthesis and he developed a new methodology for determining the absolute configuration of alkaloids. Thus, he was able to identify the anti-cancer, anti-leishmanial, anti-viral and anti-allergic properties of a number of plants through mass spectrometric and Nuclear magnetic resonance spectroscopy techniques.

Bhakuni has documented his researches in a book, Bioactive Marine Natural Products and over 300 articles published in peer-reviewed journals. His writings have been cited by several authors and he has mentored 40 doctoral scholars in their studies. A multidisciplinary program, under the title, Bioactive Substances from Indian Ocean was initiated by him during his days at the Central Drug Research Institute which is still active. He is a former president of the Indian Chemical Society (1996–97) and the Sectional Committee of Indian Science Congress Association (1994) and sat in the council of the Indian National Sciences Academy from 1982 to 1984.

Awards and honors 
The Council of Scientific and Industrial Research awarded Bhakuni the Shanti Swarup Bhatnagar Prize, one of the highest Indian science awards, in 1975. A University Grants Commission National Lecturer (1982), he received the Ranbaxy Research Award in 1988 and Sir C. V. Raman Award in 1989.  He is also a recipient of Acharya P. C. Ray Memorial Award which he received in 2000. He has delivered a number of award orations; Platinum Jubilee Lecture of Indian Science Congress Association (1993) and Dr R. C. Shah Memorial Lecture of Bombay University (1993) are some of the notable ones among them. He is an elected fellow of all the three major Indian science academies, Indian National Science Academy, Indian Academy of Sciences and the National Academy of Sciences, India.

Citations

Selected bibliography

Books

Articles

See also 
 Sir Derek Barton

Notes

References

External links 
 
 

Recipients of the Shanti Swarup Bhatnagar Award in Chemical Science
1930 births
Scientists from Uttar Pradesh
Indian organic chemists
Indian scientific authors
Alumni of the University of London
Academics of Imperial College London
Academic staff of the University of Concepción
Council of Scientific and Industrial Research
Fellows of the Indian Academy of Sciences
Fellows of the Indian National Science Academy
Fellows of The National Academy of Sciences, India
University of Allahabad alumni
Living people
20th-century Indian chemists